Bombo Radyo Holdings, Inc. (d/b/a Bombo Radyo Philippines) is a Philippine radio network of the Florete Group of Companies, which also manages banking and pawnshop operations. Its main office and headquarters are located at Florete Bldg., 2406 Nobel corner Edison Streets, Barangay San Isidro, Makati. It operates several stations across the country under the Bombo Radyo and Star FM brands. Currently, most of its stations are licensed to People's Broadcasting Service, Inc. (PBS), while a handful of its AM stations are licensed to Newsounds Broadcasting Network, Inc. (NBN). Consolidated Broadcasting System, Inc. (CBS) formerly served as licensee for some of its FM stations until 2018, when PBS took over as their licensee, following the former's non-renewal.

As Bombo, the Spanish language name for a drum, serves as the name of the station, it is no surprise that a bass drum serves as the network logo. And the bass drum beats were used between breaks during newscasts.

History
Its flagship station, Bombo Radyo Iloilo, based in Iloilo City was founded on July 6, 1966. Since the beginning of operations, the station's studios were located inside the Florete Building in Mapa Street in Iloilo City Proper, until they were relocated to the Bombo Radyo Broadcast Center alongside Luna Street in La Paz District. The station has been enjoying the prestige honor of consistently being the number one radio station since its inception during the 1970s.

DYFM was then part of the Northern Broadcasting Corporation. Don Marcelino, the grand old man of Bombo Radyo, accepted a joint venture agreement with former Ilocos Sur Governor, Antonio D. Villanueva, enabling the station to begin its broadcasts.

From humble beginnings and starting with a small number of employees, the Florete Group then acquired the operations of NBC with ten stations and two affiliates in the whole archipelago. It also entered a management alliance together with Consolidated Broadcasting Systems, Newsounds Broadcasting Network and People's Broadcasting Service. From 1967 to 1975, Bombo Radyo Philippines established every station in Laoag, Vigan, Cauayan, Bacolod, General Santos, Palawan, Baguio, Daet and Davao.

In 1976, Dr. Rogelio Florete, through the advice of his mother Doña Salome Florete, had started to helm the day-to-day operations of Bombo Radyo. In the same year, the network launched its first FM station DYRF. From then on, the network continued to expand to several markets, including the acquisition of DWXB from Universal Broadcasting Network in 1987, which would later on carry the call letters DWSM.

Radio stations
The following is a list of radio stations owned and affiliated by Bombo Radyo Philippines.

Bombo Radyo
Bombo Radyo Philippines AM division, despite the absence of a single radio station in the capital city of Manila (but maintaining a News center In Makati), is consistently strong in ratings particularly in the Visayas and Mindanao regions.

Most of Bombo Radyo AM stations are licensed to People's Broadcasting Service, except some (‡) which are licensed to Newsounds Broadcasting Network.

Star FM

Bombo Radyo's FM network group, popularly known as Star FM, is equally as strong as its sister AM network group. Its flagship station based in Manila, even with the existence of a substantial number of FM stations operating and stiff competition from both TV5's and GMA Network's own networks as well as from large radio networks (MBC's Love Radio and Yes The Best; RMN's iFM and PBS's Republika FM1 and Capital FM2), is the number one radio station in Metro Manila. The network's strongest market segment is with the provincial or rural people currently residing in Manila helped by its strong brand name in the provinces. Prior to 1994, Bombo Radyo managed its FM stations locally with each individual unique brand name. However this has all been changed in April 1994 when the network officially re-branded all 17 FM stations to carry the brand name Star FM and now share the same vision and objective. The re-branding proved to be successful as Star FM now enjoys strong ratings all across the country. On occasion, Star FM stations are tapped to do news gathering, especially when covering local and national elections or when severe weather (such as typhoons) or disasters strike an affected area.

All Star FM stations are licensed to People's Broadcasting Service since 2018.

References

External links
Official Website of Bombo Radyo Philippines
Official Website of STAR FM

Bombo Radyo Philippines
Philippine radio networks
Radio stations in the Philippines
Companies based in Iloilo City
Companies based in Makati
Mass media companies established in 1966
1966 establishments in the Philippines